Chompoo Sangpo (born August 15, 1988) is a Thai professional footballer who plays as a left back for Thai League 3 club Dragon Pathumwan Kanchanaburi.

Honours

Club
Customs Department
 Thai Division 1 League: 2007

Ayutthaya
 Regional League Division 2: 2012

Dragon Pathumwan Kanchanaburi
Thai League 3 Western Region: 2022–23

External links
 Profile at Goal
https://us.soccerway.com/players/chompoo-sangpo/397265/

1988 births
Living people
Chompoo Sangpo
Chompoo Sangpo
Association football fullbacks
Chompoo Sangpo
Chompoo Sangpo
Chompoo Sangpo
Chompoo Sangpo
Chompoo Sangpo
Chompoo Sangpo
Chompoo Sangpo
Chompoo Sangpo
Chompoo Sangpo
Chompoo Sangpo
Chompoo Sangpo
Chompoo Sangpo